Knatchbull-Hugessen is a compound surname. Notable people with the name include:

 Adrian Knatchbull-Hugessen (1891–1976), Canadian lawyer and senator
 Cecil Knatchbull-Hugessen, 4th Baron Brabourne (1863–1933), English cricketer and British peer
 Edward Knatchbull-Hugessen, 1st Baron Brabourne (1829–1893), British Liberal politician
 Edward Knatchbull-Hugessen, 2nd Baron Brabourne, (1857–1909), British peer and Liberal Party politician
 Herbert Knatchbull-Hugessen (1835–1922), British Conservative politician
 Hughe Knatchbull-Hugessen (1886–1971), British diplomat
 William Knatchbull-Hugessen (1837–1864), English cricketer
 Wyndham Knatchbull-Hugessen, 3rd Baron Brabourne (1885–1915), British peer and British Army officer

See also
 Knatchbull, surname
 James K. Hugessen (born 1933), judge serving on the Federal Court of Canada

Compound surnames